The soundtrack of the film The Sound of Music was released in 1965 by RCA Victor and is one of the most successful soundtrack albums in history, having sold more than 20 million copies worldwide. The label has also issued the soundtrack in German, Italian, Spanish and French editions.

The soundtrack reached the number one position on the Billboard 200 that year in the United States, remained in the top ten for a record 109 weeks, from May 1, 1965 to July 16, 1967, and remained on the Billboard 200 chart for 238 weeks. In 2015, Billboard named the original soundtrack album the second-best charting album of all time. It was the best-selling album in the United Kingdom in 1965, 1966 and 1968 and the second best-selling of the decade, spending a total of 70 weeks at number one on the UK Albums Chart. The album also stayed for 73 weeks on the Norwegian charts, and as of December 2017 it is the tenth best-charting album of all time in that country.

The album has been reissued several times, including anniversary editions in 1995, 2000, 2005, 2010, and 2015. These CD editions incorporate musical material from the film that would not fit on the original LP, with the 2015 release presenting the songs and score in their entirety.

Three songs from the original Broadway production, "An Ordinary Couple", "How Can Love Survive?", and "No Way to Stop It" were replaced, in the film, with two new songs, "I Have Confidence" and "Something Good". For the original Broadway show, the music was written by Richard Rodgers with lyrics by Oscar Hammerstein II; both the lyrics and music for the new songs were written by Rodgers, as Hammerstein died in 1960. All songs were arranged and conducted for the soundtrack by Irwin Kostal.

In 2018, it was selected for preservation in the National Recording Registry by the Library of Congress as being "culturally, historically, or artistically significant."

Track list

Songs
Prelude and "The Sound of Music" – Orchestra and Maria
Overture and Preludium (Dixit Dominus) – Orchestra and Nuns Chorus
"Morning Hymn" and "Alleluia" – Nuns Chorus
"Maria" – Nuns Chorus
"I Have Confidence" – Maria
"Sixteen Going on Seventeen" – Rolfe and Liesl
"My Favorite Things" – Maria
"Do-Re-Mi" – Maria and the Children
"The Sound of Music" (reprise) – The Children and the Captain
"The Lonely Goatherd" – Maria and the Children
"Edelweiss" – The Captain and Liesl
"So Long, Farewell" – The Children
"Climb Ev'ry Mountain" – Mother Abbess
"My Favorite Things" (reprise) – Maria and the Children
"Something Good" – Maria and the Captain
"Processional and Maria" (reprise) – Organ, Orchestra and Nuns Chorus
"Sixteen Going on Seventeen" (reprise) – Maria and Liesl
"Do-Re-Mi" (reprise) – Maria, the Captain and the Children
"Edelweiss" (reprise) – The Captain, Maria, the Children and Chorus
"So Long, Farewell" (reprise) – Maria, the Captain and the Children
"Climb Ev'ry Mountain" (reprise) – Chorus and Orchestra

Charts

Weekly charts

Year-end charts

Decade-end charts

Certifications and sales

References

Sources
 Hischak, Thomas. The Rodgers and Hammerstein Encyclopedia (2007). Greenwood Publishing Group. 

1965 soundtrack albums
Cast recordings
RCA Victor soundtracks
The Sound of Music
United States National Recording Registry recordings
Musical film soundtracks
Drama film soundtracks
Various artists albums
United States National Recording Registry albums
Scores that won the Best Original Score Academy Award